Bărbulescu is a Romanian surname. Notable people with the surname include:

Andrei Bărbulescu (1917-1970), Romanian football player
Ilie Bărbulescu (linguist) (1873-1945), linguist
Ilie Bărbulescu (footballer) (born 1957), Romanian former football player
Romulus Bărbulescu (1925-2010), Romanian science-fiction writer
Nineta Barbulescu (born 23 February 1968) is a Romanian career diplomat, and current Ambassador of Romania to Malaysia and (non-resident) Brunei.

Romanian-language surnames
Patronymic surnames